Herod Run is a stream in the U.S. state of Pennsylvania. It is a tributary to Standing Stone Creek.

Herod Run was named after a pioneer hunter.

References

Rivers of Pennsylvania
Rivers of Huntingdon County, Pennsylvania